was a Japanese special effects director, filmmaker and inventor. He is regarded as one of the most influential figures in the history of Japanese cinema and a creator of the Godzilla and Ultraman franchises. Known as the  he pioneered Japan's special effects industry, introducing several technological developments in film productions. During his five-decade career, Tsuburaya worked on approximately 250 films and earned six Japan Technical Awards.

Following a brief stint as an inventor, Tsuburaya was employed by Japanese cinema pioneer Yoshirō Edamasa in 1919 and began his career working as an assistant cinematographer on Edamasa's A Tune of Pity. Thereafter, he worked as an assistant cinematographer on several films, including Teinosuke Kinugasa's A Page of Madness (1926). At the age of thirty-two, Tsuburaya watched King Kong, which greatly influenced him to work in special effects. Tsuburaya completed the first iron shooting crane in October 1934, and an adaptation of the crane is still in use across the globe today. After filming his directorial debut on the cruiser Asama in the Pacific Ocean, he worked on Princess Kaguya (1935), one of Japan's first major films to incorporate special effects. His first majorly successful film in effects, The Daughter of the Samurai (1937), remarkably featured the first full-scale rear projection.

In 1937, Tsuburaya was employed by Toho and established the company's effects department. Tsuburaya directed the effects for The War at Sea from Hawaii to Malaya in 1942, which became the highest-grossing Japanese film in history upon its release. His groundbreaking effects were believed to be behind the film's major success, and he won an award for his work from the Japan Motion Picture Cinematographers Association. In 1948, however, Tsuburaya left Toho and created Tsuburaya Special Technology Laboratory with his eldest son Hajime. Thus, he worked at major Japanese studios outside Toho, creating effects for films such as Daiei's The Invisible Man Appears (1949), widely regarded as the first Japanese science fiction film.

In 1950, Tsuburaya returned to Toho alongside his effects crew from Tsuburaya Special Technology Laboratory. At age fifty-three, he gained international recognition and won his first Japan Technical Award for Special Skill for directing the effects in Ishirō Honda's kaiju film Godzilla (1954). He served as the effects director for Toho's string of financially successful science fiction films that followed, including, Rodan (1956), The Mysterians (1957), Mothra, The Last War (both 1961), King Kong vs. Godzilla (1962), and Mothra vs. Godzilla (1964). In April 1963, Tsuburaya founded Tsuburaya Special Effects Productions; his company would go onto produce the television shows Ultra Q, Ultraman (both 1966), Ultraseven (1967–1968), and Mighty Jack (1968). Ultra Q and Ultraman were extremely successful upon their 1966 broadcast, with Ultra Q making him a household name in Japan and gaining him more attention from the media who dubbed him the "God of Tokusatsu". While he spent his late years working on several Toho films and operating his company, Tsuburaya's health began to decline, and he died in January 1970.

Biography

Childhood to war years: 1901–1945

Childhood and youth (1901–1919)

Eiji Tsuburaya was born  on July 7, 1901 at the merchant house called Ōtsukaya in Sukagawa, Iwase, Fukushima Prefecture, where his family ran a malted rice business. He was the first son of Isamu Shiraishi and Sei Tsumuraya, with a large extended family. When he was three, his mother died of illness, at the age of 19, shortly after giving birth to her second son. His father subsequently left the family, and Tsuburaya was raised by his grandmother Natsu. Through Natsu, he was related to the Edo period painter Aōdō Denzen, who brought copper printing and Western painting to Japan, from whom Tsuburaya considered to have inherited his dexterity. His uncle Ichirō, who was Sei's younger brother, was five years older than him and acted like an elder brother to him. Thus, Tsuburaya began to use the nickname Eiji ("ji" indicating second-born) instead of Eiichi ("ichi" indicating first-born).

He attended the Dai'ichi Jinjo Koto Elementary School in Sukagawa beginning in 1908 and it was soon realized he had a talent for drawing. Though he often daydreamed of flying during his elementary school years, Tsuburaya was interested in regular studies. Consequently, his aunt, Yoshi, predicted he would become prosperous by the age of thirty-three. In 1910, Tsuburaya took an interest in flight due to the sensational success of Japanese aviators. Two years after, he took advantage of a photograph featured in a newspaper article and started building model airplanes as a hobby, an interest he would pursue throughout his life.

He saw his first film the ensuing year, which featured footage of a volcanic eruption on Sakurajima; strangely, Tsuburaya was more fascinated by the projector than the movie itself. In 1958, Tsuburaya told Kinema Junpo that because he was extremely fascinated by the projector, he purchased a "toy movie viewer" and created his own film strips by "carefully cutting rolled paper, then making sprocket holes, and drawing stick figures [on the paper], frame by frame." Because of his craftwork at a young age, he became a provincial celebrity and was interviewed by the Fukushima Minyu Shimbun.

In 1915, at the age of 14, he graduated the equivalent of high school, and begged his family to let him enroll in the Nippon Flying School at Haneda. After the school was closed on account of the accidental death of its founder, Seitaro Tamai, in 1917, Tsuburaya attended the Tokyo Kanda Electrical Engineering School (now Tokyo Denki University). While at the school, he became an inventor at the toy company Utsumi and created some successful products that are still widely used in the 21st century. His devised inventions at the company include the first battery-powered phone capable of making calls, an automatic speed photo box, an "automatic skate" and the toy phone.

Early career and marriage (1919–1934)

In the spring of 1919, Tsuburaya and his associates held a hanami party at a tea house where drinks were poured freely. During the party, there was a dispute between some of his coworkers and another group at the tea house. In the midst of the brawl, Tsuburaya, who had just returned from the restroom, started conversing with an individual from the other group named Yoshirō Edamasa. Edamasa, who was a pioneer of Japanese cinema, asked Tsuburaya if he was interested in movies or photography. After Tsuburaya explained to Edamasa that he certainly was interested in motion pictures, he accepted Edamasa's offer to become an employee at his company Natural Color Motion Pictures Company (dubbed "Tenkatsu"). Therefore, Tsuburaya began working in the film industry at the age of eighteen as Edamasa's camera assistant on films such as A Tune of Pity (1919) and Tombs of the Island (1920) and reportedly also served as a screenwriter during this period. Despite Tenkatsu becoming part of the Kokatsu Company and Edamasa leaving his job in March 1920, Tsuburaya maintained working at the studio until he was ordered to serve the Imperial Japanese Army in December 1922.

After leaving the army in 1923, Tsuburaya moved back to his family's house in Sukagawa. He stayed there considering possible future paths within the filmmaking industry until departing one morning on an unknown date, leaving a note: "I won't return home until I succeed in the motion picture business, even if I die trying." The next year, he work as the cinematographer on the film The Hunchback of Enmei'in Temple. Tsuburaya joined Shochiku in 1925 and would have his breakthrough as the cameraman, and assistant director on Teinosuke Kinugasa's masterpiece, A Page of Madness (released the following year). In 1927, he shoot Minoru Inuzuka's jidaigeki films Children's Swordplay and Melee both starring Kazuo Hasegawa and Tsuyako Okajima, as well as Toko Yamazaki's The Bat Copybook, Mad Blade Under the Moon, and Record of the Tragic Swords of the Tenpo Era. Because of the financial success of these films, Tsuburaya became regarded as one of the Kyoto's leading cinematographers.

In 1928, while working on eleven films at Shochiku, Tsuburaya began creating and utilizing developing camera operating techniques, including double-exposure and slow-motion camerawork. The next year, Tsuburaya constructed his own smaller version of D. W. Griffith's considerable 140-foot tall six-wheeled shooting crane, which he was able to use both in and outside of the studio. Having invented it without the benefit of using blueprints or manuals, the wooden crane allowed Tsuburaya to improve camera movement and was able to be used in and outside the studio. The creation proved a success until one day while Tsuburaya and an assistant prepared the crane to film a scene, it collapsed sending him plummeting to the ground of the studio. A witness of the incident named Masano Araki was one of the first to run to his aid. She visited Tsuburaya daily while he was in the infirmary and the pair formed a relationship shortly thereafter. On February 27, 1930, Tsuburaya married the decade-younger Araki. Their first child, Hajime, was born on April 23 the following year.

In May 1932, Tsuburaya, Akira Mimura, Hiroshi Sakai, Kohei Sugiyama, Masao Tamai, and Tadayuki Yokota established the Japan Cameraman Association, which later coalesced with other companies to become the Nippon Cinematographers Club (presently called the Japanese Society of Cinematographers). Shortly after that, the association would start to hold award ceremonies. In November of that year, Tsuburaya quit Shochiku and joined Nikkatsu Futosou Studios. Around the same time, he began using the professional name "Eiji Tsuburaya".

In 1933, Tsuburaya saw the groundbreaking American film King Kong, which inspired him to work on films featuring special effects. In 1962, Tsuburaya told the Mainichi Shimbun that he attempted to convince Nikkatsu to "import this technical know-how, but they had little interest in it because at the time, I was seen as merely a cameraman who worked on Kazuo Hasegawa's historical dramas." He managed to acquire a 35mm print of the film and started to study its special effects frame-by-frame without the advantage of documents explaining how they were produced. In October 1933, an article on the film's effect, written by Tsuburaya, was published in Photo Times, which featured an inaccurate understanding of how the scenes were created.

In the same year, Masano gave birth to a second child, a daughter named Miyako. In 1935, she would, however, die of a confidential cause that shocked her parents. Nevertheless, Tsuburaya continued with his customary life, working on several projects, and arranging methods to enhance his camerawork.

In December of 1933, Nikkatsu granted Tsuburaya permission to use and study new screen projection technology for the company's jidaigeki films. While the studio approved of his decision to project these films cast into a location use using location plates, not all of his technological developments were met with approval. During filming the final scenes for Asataro Descends Mt. Akagi in February 1934, Tsuburaya got into a significant disagreement with Nikkatsu's CEO, who had no acquaintance with what Tsuburaya was creating and assumed Tsuburaya was wasting the company's money. After the argument, Tsuburaya resigned from his job at Nikkatsu.

J.O. Studios, directorial works, and Toho (1934–1940)

Shortly after leaving Nikkatsu, he accepted an offer from Kyoto entrepreneur Yoshio Osawa to work at his company, J.O. Talkies, and research optical printing and screen projection. In October 1934, Tsuburaya and his colleagues completed the first iron shooting crane model and used it to shoot Atsuo Tomioka's The Chorus of a Million. Contrary to his previous prototype, this one was on a truck that operated on tracks, which made it able to change the camera's position in seconds. Osawa renamed the studio J.O. Studios and designated Tsuburaya as its chief cinematographer in December of that year.

From February to August of 1935, he traveled to Hawaii, the Philippines, Australia, and New Zealand on the cruiser Asama in order to shoot his directorial debut, Three Thousand Miles Across the Equator, a feature-length propaganda documentary film. During the expedition, his second son, Noboru was born on May 10 that year.

Upon returning from the voyage, Tsuburaya began work on Princess Kaguya, an adaptation of the 10th-century Japanese literary tale The Tale of the Bamboo Cutter. He not only served as the film's cinematographer but was also in charge of special effects for the first time. For the film, he worked with animator Kenzō Masaoka to create miniatures, puppets, a composite of Kaguya emerging from a cut bamboo plant, and a sequence in which a ship encounters a storm. While the original print of the film is considered lost, a shortened version screened in England in 1936 was discovered by a researcher at the British Film Institute in May 2015. The shortened version was released in Japan as part of an event marking Tsuburaya's 120th birthday on September 4 and 5, 2021.

In March of the next year, his histrionic directorial debut, Folk Song Collection: Oichi of Torioi Village, was theatrically released. It is an adventure film concerning a condemned romance, which features political tones. Folk Song Collection: Oichi of Torioi Village was the second film to star popular geisha singer Ichimaru and it also featured actor Kenji Susukida. Soon after its completion, Tsuburaya began working on Arnold Fanck's The Daughter of the Samurai (released 1937). The Daughter of the Samurai was the first German-Japanese co-production, Tsuburaya's first major success in effects, and it featured the first full-scale rear projection. The German staff were impressed by his elaborate miniature work on the project.

In September 1936, Ichizō Kobayashi merged the film studios P.C.L. Studios and P.C.L. Film Company with J.O. Studios to create the film and theatre production company Toho. Film producer Iwao Mori was made the production manager at Toho and was keenly aware of the importance of special effects during a tour of Hollywood. As a result, in 1937, Mori hired Tsuburaya at the company's Tokyo Studio, establishing the special effects department on November 27, 1937, and treating him as the section's manager. Shortly after, Tsuburaya received a research budget and began studying optical printers to create Japan's first version of the device, which he designed. Among Tsuburaya's first film assignments at Toho were The Abe Clan, a jidaigeki film directed by Hisatora Kumagai, and the unreleased propaganda musical The Song of Major Nanjo (both 1938). The latter film was directed and shot by Tsuburaya, and he completed it on September 6 of that year.

In 1939, because of an instruction from the Imperial government, he joined the Kumagaya Aviation Academy of the Imperial Army Corps and was entrusted to shoot flight-training films. After impressing his superiors with his aerial photography, Tsuburaya was given more assignments and a master's certificate during his almost three years at the academy. In November 1939, while Tsuburaya was still at the flight school and undertaking assignments at Toho, he was appointed head of Toho's Special Arts Department. A month after that, he was commissioned to shoot a science film for Toho's then-recently assembled educational section. Under governance demands, Toho was mandated to maintain the creation of propaganda films. Accordingly, in May 1940, Tsuburaya began directing the documentary The Imperial Way of Japan for Toho Education Films' branch Toho National Policy Film Association. He also filmed the effects of Sotoji Kimura's Navy Bomber Squadron, featuring the bombing scene with a miniature airplane for the first time in his career, and he was given his first credit for special effects. Navy Bomber Squadron was believed lost for over sixty years until an unfinished copy of the film was discovered and screened in 2006.

In September 1940, Yutaka Abe's The Burning Sky, was released to Japanese cinemas. Tsuburaya was in charge of effects for the film and received his first accolade from the Japan Motion Picture Cinematographers Association. His next undertaking, Son Gokū, was released on November 6, 1940. In the August 1960 issue of American Cinematographer, he is quoted saying that for Son Gokū: "I was called upon to create and photograph a monkey-like monster which was supposed to fly through the air", adding: "I managed the job with some success and this assignment set the pattern for my future work."

War years (1941–1945)

On December 7, 1941, the Japanese attacked the United States navy base on Pearl Harbor, causing a sensation of national pride in Japan. Consequently, the Imperial Japanese Government tasked Toho to produce a film that would influence the nation to believe they would win the Pacific War. The resulting film, Kajirō Yamamoto's war epic The War at Sea from Hawaii to Malaya (1942), became the highest-grossing Japanese film in history upon its release in December 1942 and won Kinema Junpos Best Film Award. Tsuburaya directed its effects, which he created with the assistance of navy-provided photographs of the Pearl Harbor attack, and he worked with future Godzilla collaborates Akira Watanabe and Teizō Toshimitsu for the first time. His groundbreaking effects work was supposedly behind the film's major success and accordingly, he won the Technical Research Award from the Japan Motion Picture Cinematographers Association. The film depicted the attack so realistically that footage from it was later featured in documentaries on the Pearl Harbor attack.

Around the same time as The War at Sea from Hawaii to Malaya was in production, Toho's effects department was filming Japan's first puppet film Ramayana. The film's screenplay, inspired by the Sanskrit epic of the same name, was written by future Moonlight Mask creator Kōhan Kawauchi the previous year under Tsuburaya's supervision.

Tsuburaya's next four major productions were all war films: Masahiro Makino's The Opium Wars, Tadashi Imai's Watchtower Suicide Squad, Kunio Watanabe's Decisive Battle in the Skies and Kajirō Yamamoto's follow-up to The War at Sea from Hawaii to Malaya, General Kato's Falcon Fighters (all produced in 1943). For The Opium Wars, Tsuburaya and his team created miniature navy battle sequences and animation synthesis in urban landscapes. Remarkably, during the production of General Kato's Falcon Fighters (released in 1944), Tsuburaya had his first meeting with his future collaborator, filmmaker Ishirō Honda. After watching The War at Sea from Hawaii to Malaya, Honda became interested in special effects and believed Tsuburaya's work in General Kato's Falcon Fighters was inferior in scope, but the art and gunpowder technology had enhanced. Additionally, Tsuburaya expressed dissatisfaction with the size of the shooting stage, the art materials, the method of performance, etc.

Shortly before Toho distributed General Kato's Falcon Fighters in cinemas, Masano and Tsuburaya's third son and last child, Akira, was born on February 12, 1944. Akira was the first of the couple's sons to receive baptism since his mother had been converted to the Catholic Church by her younger sister. Masano persisted in introducing her children to Catholicism and ultimately converted her husband.

On March 10, 1945, Tsuburaya and his family sought refuge for two hours in their residence's bomb shelter as the Tokyo air raids. During the two-hour-long attacks, he told his children fairy tales to keep them quiet. Later that year, Tsuburaya made the effects in Torajirō Saitō's Five Men from Tokyo, for which he was credited as Eiichi Tsuburaya. Five Men from Tokyo is a comedy film concerning five men who struggle to make a living after returning to Tokyo after the war and remain unemployed due to the Tokyo air raids on March 10, 1945, at the end of World War II.

 Occupation years to Chūshingura: 1946–1962 
 Early postwar work (1946–1954) 
Even though Toho was unaffected by the Tokyo bombings as the company was located in Seijo, the amount of film productions was reduced due to the Occupation of Japan. Because of this, the company produced only eighteen films in 1946, with Tsuburaya working on eight of them. Since he and his effects unit at the company had a minor slate of films to work on, Tsuburaya began testing matte painting and optical printing. While the effects sector of Toho was experimenting with this equipment, meanwhile, the company was struggling.

Toho was on the verge of disbandment due to the  that occurred at the studio during the late 1940s. According to Akira Tsuburaya, for his father to get to work he had to sneak around the Japanese police and U.S. tanks deployed during these strikes and disputes. To repel the police, the labor strikers erected a barricade, using a large fan made by the special effects department of the company that was equipped with the Zero fighter engine that Tsuburaya had used during the war. These events lead to the creation of Shintoho; Tsuburaya would create the effects for Shintoho's first film, A Thousand and One Nights with Toho (1947).

In late March 1948, Tsuburaya was purged from Toho by the Supreme Commander for the Allied Powers because of his comprehensive miniatures featured in The War at Sea from Hawaii to Malaya. Therefore, Toho disbanded their special effects division and Tsuburaya, with his son Hajime, founded the independent special effects company Tsuburaya Special Technology Laboratory, an unofficial juridical entity. Henceforth, he worked at major film studios outside Toho.

In 1949, five major Daiei Film productions featuring effects directed by Tsuburaya were released to Japanese theaters: Japanese horror filmmaker Bin Kato's The White Haired Fiend, Keigo Kimura's Flowers of Raccoon Palace, Kiyohiko Ushihara's The Rainbow Man, Akira Nobuchi's The Ghost Train, and Nobuo Adachi's The Invisible Man Appears. The Invisible Man Appears made a significant contribution as the first substantial Japanese science fiction film and the country's first adaption of H. G. Wells' novel The Invisible Man. Created by studying the eponymous 1933 film adaptation of Wells' novel, Daiei had intended this film to be Tsuburaya's full-scale postwar recovery, featuring special effects superior to those in Universal Pictures' The Invisible Man film series. Tsuburaya, however, was disappointed with his lack of competence on the project and gave up his ambition to become a Daiei employee after The Invisible Man Appears was finished.

In 1950, Tsuburaya relocated some equipment and employees at Tsuburaya Special Technology Laboratory to Toho; his independent company was merely the size of six tatami mats inside Toho Studios. In the same year, he continued to direct the effects for films from other company's such as Toyoko Eiga's anti-war film Listen to the Voices of the Sea. While slowly rebuilding the company's Special Arts Department, he filmed all of the title cards, trailers, and the logo for Toho's films from 1950 to 1954. The first production featuring major contributions by Tsuburaya upon his return to Toho was reportedly a 1950 film directed by Hiroshi Inagaki based on the life of Japanese swordsman Sasaki Kojirō. During this period, Tsuburaya also worked at Toho on Senkichi Taniguchi's anti-war film Escape at Dawn (1950), directed the effects for Taniguchi's Beyond Love and Hate, staged miniature ships to depict a battle between pirate ships in Hiroshi Inagaki's Pirate Ship, and directed the effects for Kenji Mizoguchi's The Lady of Musashino.

In February 1952, Tsuburaya's exile from public office was officially lifted. That same month, Ishirō Honda's second feature film, The Skin of the South, was released to Japanese theaters. Tsuburaya directed the film's effects for the typhoon and landslide scenes, which was his first experience acting as the effects director on a film by the future Godzilla director. Tsuburaya collaborated with Honda and producer Tomoyuki Tanaka on The Man Who Came to Port later that year, which marked the first time the trio, who are considered the creators of Godzilla, collaborated.

During World War II, Toho began researching 3D films and completed a 3D film process known as "Tovision". While it was later abandoned, the "Tovision" project at Toho was later revived when the 3D film Bwana Devil (1952) became a box office hit in the United States. Hence, the company produced its first 3D film, future Godzilla co-writer Takeo Murata's The Sunday That Jumped Out (1953). It features cinematography by Tsuburaya, who shot this short film using an interlocking camera. After the completion of The Sunday That Jumped Out, Murata discussed creating a tokusatsu film about a giant whale attacking Tokyo, which Tsuburaya devised the previous year. Tsuburaya, therefore, resubmitted the conception of this production to producer Iwao Mori. Although this project never materialized, elements of it were inserted into early drafts of Godzilla the following year.

Tsuburaya's next project, the war epic Eagle of the Pacific (1953), was his first significant partnership with Ishirō Honda. As the film featured many effects sequences from The War at Sea from Hawaii to Malaya, Tsuburaya used only a small crew to shot its new effects. The ensuing year, he and Honda collaborated on another war film, Farewell Rabaul, released to Japanese theaters in February 1954, to moderate box office success. His effects for this assignment were more advanced than in Eagle of the Pacific, featuring many more of his technological approaches and syntheses. Because of the success of Eagle of the Pacific and Farewell Rabaul, Tomoyuki Tanaka believed Tsuburaya should make more tokusatsu (special effects) films with Honda. Tsuburaya's next film would become Japan's first global hit and gain him international attention.

 International recognition (1954–1959) 

After failing to renegotiate with the Indonesian government for the production of In the Shadow of Glory, producer Tomoyuki Tanaka began to consider creating a giant monster (or kaiju) film, inspired by Eugène Lourié's The Beast from 20,000 Fathoms (1953) and the Daigo Fukuryū Maru incident. He believed that it would be potential due to the financial success of monster films and nuclear fears generating news. Thus, he wrote an outline for the project and pitched it to Iwao Mori. Following Tsuburaya's agreement to create its effects, Mori approved the production, eventually titled Godzilla, in mid-April 1954; filmmaker Ishirō Honda soon took over the directing duties. During preproduction, Tsuburaya considered using stop motion to depict the titular monster but, as stated by special effects crew member Fumio Nakadai, had to employ the "costume method" because he "finally decided it wouldn't work". This technique is now known as "suitmation".

He and his relatively younger crew worked relentlessly, regularly starting at 9:00 a.m., preparing at 5:00 p.m., and finishing the shoot at 4 or 5 a.m. the following morning. Shortly after Tsuburaya completed filming its effects, Tsuburaya, Tanaka, and Honda were shown the finished film on October 23, 1954, and its staff and cast were shown the film on October 25. Upon its nationwide release on November 3, Tsuburaya's effects received critical acclaim and the film became a box office hit. As a result, Godzilla established Toho as the most successful effects company in the world and Tsuburaya obtained his first Japan Technical Award for his efforts.

Instantly after completing Godzilla in October, Tsuburaya began working on another Toho-produced science fiction film, The Invisible Avenger, which was released to Japanese theaters in December 1954 under the title Invisible Man. This tokusatsu production was directed by Motoyoshi Oda and featured special effects and photography by Tsuburaya. Because The Invisible Avenger was his second film to feature an invisible character, after The Invisible Man Appears (1949), he inherited and expanded the technology used in The Invisible Man Appears for the movie. Tsuburaya instructed his crew to portray the title character's invisibility in various ways throughout the film, including optical synthesis and suggested that the character disguised his invisibility ability by dressing up as a clown.

Due to the enormous box-office success of Godzilla, Toho quickly gathered the majority of the crew behind the film to create a smaller-budget sequel to the film, entitled Godzilla Raids Again. Tsuburaya was officially given the title of special effects director for the first time on Godzilla Raids Again, as he was always credited under "special technique" beforehand. Shot in less than 3 months, the film opened in April 1955. A month after the release of Godzilla Raids Again, Tsuburaya began directing the effects of Half Human, his second kaiju film collaboration with director Ishirō Honda. Among his efforts on this film, the effects director notably created stop-motion animation, rear-screen miniature, and miniature avalanche sequences.

In April 1956, Godzilla became the first Japanese film to be widely distributed throughout the United States and it was later released worldwide, leading Tsuburaya to gain international recognition. However, for its American release, it was retitled Godzilla, King of the Monsters!, heavily re-edited, and featured new footage with actor Raymond Burr.

Tsuburaya's next major undertaking, The Legend of the White Serpent, a Hong Kong-Japanese film adaptation of a novel by Fusao Hayashi based on the Chinese legend Legend of the White Snake, was Toho's first tokusatsu feature completely filmed in color (via Eastmancolor). After working on The Legend of the White Serpent, Tsuburaya made the renowned Toho logo and his unit constructed the opening credits for most of the company's films. Between working on large-scale Toho films, he created the effects for Toho's musical The Snapping Turtle, Nippon TV's Ninja Arts of Sanada Castle and theatrical productions for Tokyo Takarazuka Theater.

Toho's next assignment for Tsuburaya was Rodan, the first kaiju film produced in color. 60% of Rodan'''s  budget was spent on Tsuburaya's effects, which was expended on optical animation, matte paintings, and extremely elaborate miniature sets created to be destroyed or flown over by its namesake monster (played by original Godzilla suit actor Haruo Nakajima). Rodan required a large number of model sets in a variety of sizes, including 1/10, 1/20, 1/25, and 1/30, to be developed and assembled by Tsuburaya's division. The film premiered in Japanese theaters in December 1956 and upon its release in the United States the following year, earned more at the box office than any previous science fiction film.Throne of Blood, an adaptation of William Shakespeare's Macbeth from renowned filmmaker Akira Kurosawa, was Tsuburaya's first film release of 1957. Kurosawa cut several scenes by Tsuburaya due to his displeasure with the amount of footage he made for Throne of Blood. He next served as the special effects director for The Mysterians, a science fiction epic directed by Ishirō Honda. It was the first color Cinemascope film by Honda and Tsuburaya and is often called the "definitive science fiction movie". He obtained another Japan Technical Award for his widescreen effects in The Mysterians.

A new subgenre for Toho was born with Tsuburaya's first movie of 1958, The H-Man, which was the first entry in the "Transforming Human Series". He next directed the effects for Honda's Varan the Unbelievable about a giant monster awakened in the Tōhoku mountains that surfaces in Tokyo Bay. Initially planned as a made-for-television film co-produced between Toho and the American company AB-PT Pictures, the production was plagued with numerous difficulties. AB-PT collapsed during production, leading Toho to alter the film's status to a theatrical feature. Tsuburaya's final film released in 1958 was Kurosawa's The Hidden Fortress.

Tsuburaya began 1959 by working on the special effects for Mighty Atom, a tokusatsu television series based on Osamu Tezuka's manga series Astro Boy. Although neither he nor his company were credited in the show itself when it aired between March 7, 1959, and May 28, 1960, he supervised the miniature photography done by his staff at Tsuburaya Special Technology Laboratory. Around the same time, Tsuburaya also directed the special effects for a storm sequence featured in Honda's Inao: Story of an Iron Arm, for which he also constructed the miniature for the title character's rowboat. Next, he worked on Monkey Sun, co-written and directed by Kajirō Yamamoto as an all-star remake of his 1940 film Son Gokū, on which the effects director also labored. Taking inspiration from watching soybean paste in the broth of his wife's miso soup, he created scenes with storm clouds and smoke and ash erupting from three volcanoes. His effects featured in the film were described by biographer August Ragone as "comical and surreal".

After operating on the Tokyo Takarazuka Theater production The Story of Bali, he directed the effects for Shūe Matsubayashi's Submarine I-57 Will Not Surrender, his first war film in six years. In order to film submarine scenes for Matsubayashi's film, a model seabed terrain was built in the first Toho miniature pool (dubbed the "Small Pool" after a more considerable version was completed). He also filmed his effects for the film in color, but they were converted to black-and-white for the final film. In August 1959, Tsuburaya and his sons Hajime and Noboru shot footage of two dragon puppets in Tsuburaya's laboratory at their house in Setagaya, Tokyo for a Hong Kong film company.

Tsuburaya's following significant production, director Hiroshi Inagaki's big-budget religious epic The Three Treasures, was created as Toho's celebratory thousandth film. Based on legends featured in the Kojiki and Nihon Shoki, it stars Toshiro Mifune as Yamato Takeru and the kami Susanoo. The effects director and his crew shot several substantial sequences included in the film such as a battle between Mifune's character Susanoo and the eight-headed dragon Yamata no Orochi and an eruption of Mount Fuji. It earned over  against a  budget, ranking as Toho's highest-grossing film of the year and the second-highest-grossing film altogether. He won the Japan Technical Award for Special Skill and was presented with the Special Achievement Award at Movie Day. While he was pleased with the film's success, Tsuburaya became disappointed after seeing a picture of the heads of the Yamata no Orochi prop held up by piano wires in a newspaper article concerning its special effects. Accordingly, he declined an interview with the newspaper because he believed the photograph "broke children's dreams".

When the Space Race erupted between the U.S. and the Soviet Union in the late 1950s, Tsuburaya counseled Toho to produce a film about a lunar expedition, believing that such a film would soon materialize. Therefore, his next film, Battle in Outer Space, was a science fiction epic about a group of astronauts who battle extraterrestrials on the surface of the moon. Tsuburaya paid homage to producer George Pal's Destination Moon (1950) in the film's moon landing sequence; he met Pal in Los Angeles in 1962. Because films featuring his contributions attained global popularity and praise for Japanese cinema, Hearst filmed Tsuburaya directing the film's effects and he received the Special Award of Merit at the 4th Movie Day ceremony prior to its release.

 From The Secret of the Telegian to Chūshingura (1960–1962) 

A smaller-scale science fiction film, entitled The Secret of the Telegian, which was Toho's second installment in the Transforming Human Series, marked Tsuburaya's first assignment of 1960. Tsuburaya next took on a project of a much larger extent, Storm Over the Pacific, the first-ever color war film. The "Big Pool" was created at Toho Studios and used for the first time during the production of this film. It would later be utilized in the production of virtually every Godzilla film until it was demolished after the filming of the ending of Godzilla: Final Wars (2004). Storm Over the Pacific obtained critical acclaim upon its release and numerous of Tsuburaya's effects sequences were later be featured in Midway (1976), a film by Jack Smight that was also about the Pacific War. Throughout the rest of the year, he worked on notable productions such as the third film in the Transforming Human Series, The Human Vapor, and oversaw the creation of an extremely detailed miniature of Osaka Castle and directed its destruction scene in Hiroshi Inagaki's jidaigeki film The Story of Osaka Castle.

Next, Tsuburaya directed the effects for Mothra (1961), another big-budget kaiju film created in collaboration with Ishirō Honda. Allegedly inspired by his dreams, Tsuburaya created the namesake titular giant divine moth kaiju, which would become one of the icons of Japanese fantasy cinema alongside Godzilla and Rodan and later appear in numerous films thereafter. Though its considerable budget allowed the effects department to create the largest-scale miniature set ever constructed for a Toho production, Tsuburaya was displeased with some sequences shot for the film, especially the scene where the powerful gusts of wind generated by Mothra's wings cause a vehicle to crash into a store window during the monster's attack on the fictional New Kirk City, and some composite cuts of the Shobijin. Nonetheless, he decided to keep these scenes upon editing Mothra in postproduction. The film opened on July 30, 1961, becoming a massive box office hit and, as stated by biographer August Ragone, an "instant classic" alongside Honda and Tsuburaya's earlier kaiju films Godzilla and Rodan. Ragone asserted that "no other kaiju eiga  before or since has touched its size and magnitude", adding: "It's difficult to imagine a film like Mothra being produced today."

After directing blue screen dream scenes with actor Toshiro Mifune for Hiroshi Inagaki's film The Youth and His Amulet (1961), Tsuburaya moved on to direct the effects for Shūe Matsubayashi's  epic tokusatsu film The Last War. The Last War emerged as a major hit upon its October 1961 release, and Tsuburaya's effects received critical acclaim. Additionally, he later listed this film as one of his "masterpieces". Producer Tomoyuki Tanaka, assured from the box office success of Mothra and The Last War, gave Honda and Tsuburaya their most considerable budget yet and 300 days to shoot Gorath, their next science fiction epic. Although Gorath is considered to feature some of his best work, it was a box office failure when it was released in March 1962.

After filming Gorath, Tsuburaya began planning to work on other projects such as a new version of Princess Kaguya. However, he postponed those to direct the special effects for Honda's King Kong vs. Godzilla. Early drafts of the script were sent back with notes from the studio asking that the monster antics be made as "funny as possible". This comical approach was embraced by Tsuburaya, who wanted to appeal to children's sensibilities and broaden the genre's audience. Much of the monster battle was filmed to contain a great deal of humor but the approach was not favored by most of the effects crew, who "couldn't believe" some of the things Tsuburaya asked them to do, such as Kong and Godzilla volleying a giant boulder back and forth. According to Sadamasa Arikawa, the suit sculptors had a difficult time coming up with a King Kong suit that appeased Tsuburaya; the King Kong suits used in the final film were described by August Ragone as "less than stellar". For their portrayals, Tsuburaya gave Nakajima (playing Godzilla) and the King Kong suit actor (Shoichi Hirose) free rein to choreograph their own moves. Tsuburaya directed sequences at a miniature outdoor set on the Miura Coast that depicted the giant octopus's attack on the Faro Island village and later ate some of the four octopuses for dinner with some of the special effects crew members. During its original theatrical release in August 1962, King Kong vs. Godzilla became the second-highest-grossing Japanese film in history and was attended by 11.2 million people, leading it to be regarded as the most-attended film in the Godzilla series.

Tsuburaya's final film release of 1962 was Inagaki's epic jidaigeki film Chūshingura: Hana no Maki, Yuki no Maki, for which he and his department made forced perspective stages and various optical effects. Produced by Toho—like King Kong vs. Godzilla—in celebration of their 30th anniversary, it was Toho's fourth highest-grossing film of the year and the tenth-highest altogether.

Birth of a company to last years: 1963–1970
Birth of a company and career expansion (1963–1965)
The first film released in 1963 featuring Tsuburaya's contributions was another war film by Shūe Matsubayashi, Attack Squadron!, released in January of that year. Though not an epic like Toho's previous war movies, the film nevertheless features several miniature Japanese and American aircraft by Tsuburaya's crew, with some of the models portrayed using radio control. The sole new miniature battleship built for the film was Yamato, which was an enormous motorized model constructed at 1/15 scale and measuring 17.5 meters (or 57.5 feet).

After visiting Hollywood to observe the special effects work of major American studios, Tsuburaya founded his own independent company Tsuburaya Special Effects Productions (later called simply Tsuburaya Productions) on April 12, 1963. It was initially handled entirely by his family: Tsuburaya was reported as its director general and present, his wife (Masano) was on the director's board, and his second son (Noboru) was declared the accountant. Hajime, Tsuburaya's eldest son, would soon join the company as well, leaving his award-winning directorial employment at the Tokyo Broadcasting System. Around August of the same year, Kiyoshi Suzuki was employed as a photography assistant, and Koichi Takano, who was a news cameraman for Kyodo Television from Toho, was hired at the company as a cameraman. Tsuburaya himself employed Takano for Tsuburaya Productions' first full-scale tokusatsu production, Alone Across the Pacific (1963), which required twenty-five effects sequences. Throughout the rest of the year, Tsuburaya worked for his new company and Toho, where he still controlled the effects department despite canceling his exclusive contract with Toho.

The second film released in 1963 to feature his contributions was Li Han-hsiang's Hong Kong musical film The Love Eterne. The effects director was assigned to stage the scene where an earthquake split the tomb of the character Liang Shanbo (played by Ivy Ling Po) in two and the protagonist (played by Betty Loh Ti)'s ascension into heaven. Cinematographer Tadashi Nishimoto traveled to Japan in order to film Tsuburaya's effects at Shintoho's second studio.

Tsuburaya's next production, described by August Ragone as a "lighthearted World War I adventure", was entitled The Siege of Fort Bismarck. For his first partnership with director Kengo Furusawa, Tsuburaya's division developed several new models for the film, including large-scale miniatures, full-scale replications of early twentieth-century flying vehicles, and an enormous outdoor model set of Fort Bismarck. According to Ragone, Tsuburaya enjoyed working on this film but he nonetheless desired to make his own tribute feature to Japanese aviation pioneers.

Shortly after completing The Siege of Fort Bismarck in April 1963, he began preproduction work on Matango, another film created in cooperation with Ishirō Honda and is regarded as the final entry in the Transforming Human Series. In contrary to the majority of the previous Toho films featuring monsters, the actors were capable of psychical interaction with the suit actors portraying the monsters on a sound stage. Sadao Iizuka said that Tsuburaya "focused" Toho to purchase the "Optical Printer 1900 Series" in order to facilitate the effects featured in the film, noting that optical synthesis technology became popular after the film's release. A box office failure upon its Japanese release, it was not included in Kinema Junpos list of height-grossing films for the year, and has been since anointed "virtually unknown film", except to "aficionados of Asian cult cinema, fans of weird literature, and sleepless consumers of late-night television programming".

Tsuburaya soon moved on to film miniatures and produce optical animation (via his newly purchased Optical Printer 1900 Series) for The Lost World of Sinbad. This film, directed by Senkichi Taniguchi from a screenplay by Mothra and King Kong vs. Godzilla writer Shinichi Sekizawa, included an acclaimed choreographed chase sequence between a wizard and a witch created via animation and matte photography that gained Tsuburaya another Japan Technical Award for Special Skill.

Tsuburaya almost immediately started work on another Honda-directed science fiction tokusatsu movie, Atragon (1963). Based on Shunrō Oshikawa's novel The Undersea Warship and incorporated with Shigeru Komatsuzaki's novel Undersea Empire, the film concerns a group of former colleges, friends, and family that must convince the captain of the battleship Gotengo, Hachiro Jinguji (played by Jun Tazaki), to use his battleship to save the world from the invading ancient undersea civilization of Mu who are using their advanced technology and guardian sea dragon Manda in an attempt to concern the surface world. Since Toho desired to distribute the film in Japanese theaters on December 22 of that year, Tsuburaya was given roughly two months to shoot the effects sequences for Atragon. Thus, in order to achieve the company's goal, he separated his special effects team into two units, assuring that it would allow him to complete the assignment as soon as possible. Four miniatures were constructed to represent the Gotengo, with the largest, a  radio-operated model, measuring 4.5 meters (15 feet) in length. Although it was quickly converted and developed, the film is regarded as "one of the cornerstones of Japanese cinema" and is still often referenced in media.

Since this was the peak of his career, Tsuburaya was concluding model effects for the Hiroshi Inagaki-directed jidaigeki film Whirlwind and Atragon simultaneously. As both Inagaki and Tsuburaya were busy producing other films, they never directly discussed how the threatening tornado in an effects sequence for Whirlwind would appear onscreen. Fortunately, both had the same opinion on the direction of materialization. During this period, lack of sleep and workload-related stress were taking a toll on Tsuburaya's health, so he was often discovered sleeping in his chair during scene setups for his effects shoots.

The third installment in the Godzilla film series, Mothra vs. Godzilla (1964), was Tsuburaya's next film. Often regarded as Tsuburaya's best kaiju film, it was produced in celebration of the tenth-anniversary of Toho's kaiju films and depicts the battle between Godzilla and the title character of the self-titled 1961 film Mothra (as suggested by its title). He utilized his 1900 optical printer to remove damages in composite photography shots for the picture and to create Godzilla's atomic breath. Tsuburaya went on location to shoot some composite plates of Nagoya Castle for the scene where Godzilla destroyed the castle. Nakajima was, however, incapable of entirely destroying the model based on the castle and attempted to salvage the shot by having Godzilla appear enraged by the Castle's strong fortification, but Tsuburaya chose to re-shoot the scene with a rebuilt model designed to crumble more easily. He also went on location to shoot a segment featuring the United States navy discharging missiles at Godzilla for the U.S. market which was discluded from the Japanese version. This was one of the rare occasions that a sequence with Godzilla was shoot outside Toho Studios.

In the spring of 1964, Tsuburaya received a visit from frequent collaborator Ishirō Honda on the Hawaiian Island of Kauai. The effects director was shooting a dogfight and plain crash sequence for renowned singer and actor Frank Sinatra's None but the Brave (released in 1965), which was his sole directorial picture. As the first Japanese-American coproduction, this anti-war epic revolves around a troop of American soldiers stranded in the Pacific during World War II who are forced to collaborate with an opposition Japanese unit that has also been stranded on the island. During Honda's visit, Tsuburaya told him that he was planning the first Tsuburaya Productions-produced television series then-titled Unbalance but was struggling to find a lead actor for the series. Honda convinced Kenji Sahara (who played in None but the Brave and also starred in several Honda-Tsuburaya kaiju films) to play the team leader for the intended show that later became Ultra Q (1966). None but the Brave was released in Japan by Toho on January 15, 1965, and was distributed by Warner Bros. in the U.S. the following month, where it grossed  and obtained mixed reviews from critics.

Tsuburaya ordered Oxberry's 1200 optical printer while in New York in January 1964, which only one other studio in the world owned at the time, Disney. He operated this technology on Ultra Q, Tsuburaya Productions' first television series, which was a combination of his projects that he devised that spring, tentatively titled Unbalance and WoO. Principal photography on Ultra Q began on September 27, 1964, with the shooting of the episode "Mammoth Flower". Broadcast on the Tokyo Broadcasting System from January 2 to July 3, 1966, the series centers on a trio who investigates strange phenomena ranging from supernatural threats to kaiju in the 20th century. Upon broadcast, 30% of Japanese households with televisions watched the show, making Eiji Tsuburaya a household name and gaining him even more attention from the media who dubbed him the "God of Tokusatsu".

After directing the effects on Honda's kaiju film Dogora (released in August 1964), he worked on another Honda-directed kaiju film, Ghidorah, the Three-Headed Monster, making 1964 the only time two Godzilla pictures were released in the same year (the first Godzilla film release of the year being Mothra vs. Godzilla). As it was produced as one of the features celebrating ten years of Toho's kaiju films, it featured a dragon kaiju designed as an homage to Yamata no Orochi, King Ghidorah, who opposed Godzilla, Rodan, and Mothra in the film. Screenwriter Shinichi Sekizawa proposed to Tsuburaya that the Ghidorah suit be constructed from light silicon-based textiles to allow more mobility for the suit actor. Tsuburaya and Toho executives decided to anthropomorphize the monsters, despite Honda feeling "uncomfortable" with the decision and being reluctant to use The Peanuts (who previously played the Mothra's fairies in the namesake film) as the interpreters for the kaiju in the summit scene. During the shooting of Godzilla and Rodan's match in Toho Studios' enormous water tank, one of the borders of the tank was exposed on film. Tsuburaya hid this mistake by superimposing trees in the area. King Ghidorah would go on to become a frequent antagonist of the Godzilla franchise.

Tsuburaya began 1965 by directing the effects for Seiji Maruyama's war film Retreat From Kiska. Tsuburaya spent two months filming the scene where the fleet circles Kiska Island in thick fog on an indoor stage set because the fog could not be controlled by the wind during open shooting. The sequence where the fleet slips through the rocks was realized by laying a rail at the bottom of the special effects pool and running the miniature of the warship on it. The miniatures could not be very large for on-set shooting, and the water flow was pumped to adjust the proportions of the waves and wakes. A large outdoor pool is used in the scene of port entry and departure without fog. For his work on Kiska, he won a Japan Technical Award for Special Skill at the 19th Japan Technical Awards.

Tsuburaya's next production originated in the United States around 1960 when King Kong stop-motion animator Willis H. O'Brien proposed King Kong vs. Frankenstein. O'Brien hired John Beck to produce this project; Beck then offered the idea to Toho, who scrapped the concept in favor of Kong battling Godzilla, and thus became the blockbuster King Kong vs. Godzilla in 1962. The following year, Sekizawa took O'Brien's concept and wrote the screenplay Frankenstein vs. The Human Vapor, a planned entry in the Transforming Human Series. However, the project was canceled after Matango became a box office failure upon its release that year. In July 1964, screenwriter Kaoru Mabuchi submitted a screenplay titled Frankenstein vs. Godzilla, however, it was abandoned in favor of Mothra vs. Godzilla. Therefore, Mabuchi converted his Frankenstein vs. Godzilla screenplay into a new script that had Frankenstein's monster fight a new subterranean kaiju named Baragon.

Tsuburaya was enthusiastic about this picture, entitled Frankenstein vs. Baragon, because the titular monsters were going to be more diminutive than normal, allowing his team to build larger model sets than their Godzilla movies, and an actor in makeup—Kōji Furuhata—would play Frankenstein rather than a stuntman in a monster suit. In spite of featuring model sets among the most enormous and intricate detailed models for a Honda-Tsuburaya collaboration, some critics have questioned why Tsuburaya used a puppet to portray a horse for a sequence in which Baragon overruns a farmstead instead of another method such as a shot of an actual equine. According to Koichi Takano, Tsuburaya said that he used the puppet because it was "more fun". Tsuburaya also made a scene depicting the atomic bomb falling upon Hiroshima, which Honda biographers Steve Ryfle and Ed Godziszewski called an "impressionistic display of smoke and fire".

After postproduction on the film was finalized for its Japanese release two days after the twentieth anniversary of the Hiroshima atomic bombing (August 8, 1965), American co-producer Henry G. Saperstein asked for Toho to film a new ending for the U.S. version where Frankenstein confronts a giant octopus that drowns him in a lake at Mount Fuji rather than Frankenstein, after defeating Baragon, falling into an aperture that opens underneath him at the bottom of the mountain. Tsuburaya and Honda, accordingly, reassembled the cast and crew to shoot the new ending which was eventually left unused in both American and Japanese iterations of the motion picture, though it later was screened at a fan convention in 1982 and featured as a bonus on home video.

Tsuburaya quickly moved on to his next project, Kengo Furusawa's The Crazy Adventure, a film produced in celebration of the tenth anniversary of the Crazy Cats comedy group. Inspired by recent popular spy films, Tsuburaya's department extensively used "wire action" in outdoor locations and lead actor Hitoshi Ueki performed most of the action sequences without stunts for the film. Tsuburaya also directed miniature effects sequences for the film. Released in Japan on October 31, 1965, The Crazy Adventure was a tremendous hit, earning more at the box office than Tsuburaya's Ghidorah, the Three-Headed Monster.

Next, Tsuburaya worked on Honda's Invasion of Astro-Monster (1965), the sixth film in the Godzilla franchise and Shōwa period as well as the second collaboration between Toho and UPA. A direct sequel to Ghidorah, the Three-Headed Monster, it focuses on two astronauts who land on a planet occupied by an alien race known as the Xiliens who ask humanity for assistance with Godzilla and Rodan in defeating King Ghidorah, who they claim is intruding on their homeworld. After bringing the astronauts, scientist Sakurai, Godzilla, and Rodan to their planet the aliens attempt to use Ghidorah, Godzilla, and Rodan to conquer the Earth via mind-controlling them. The last Godzilla film to feature the contributions of Tsuburaya's entire effects unit, it notably features Godzilla's renowned Shie victory dance that was included in the film after actor Yoshio Tsuchiya suggested it to Tsuburaya, who was already supportive of anthropomorphizing monster characters with comical characteristics. For his work on this film he obtained the Japan Technical Award for Special Skill for Invasion of Astro-Monster the following year.

Ultraman and beyond (1966–1967)
At the height of Ultra Q's popularity, TBS broadcast "The Father of Ultra Q", an episode of their documentary series Modern Leaders, on June 2, 1966. In the episode, Tsuburaya is filmed at work and elsewhere, and he is even interviewed by individuals dressed in Ultra Q monster costumes during which he mentioned creating a new show to follow Ultra Q.

In the autumn of the previous year, preparation for the next tokusatsu series began after the premiere date of January 2, 1966, for Ultra Q was decided. TBS executives wanted to produce a series as thriving as Ultra Q and wanted a full-color program that would "take the monster line to the next level" according to August Ragone. Tsuburaya and writer Tetsuo Kinjō decided to take the barebones concept of Ultra Q about civilians and scientists haggling monsters and have a group, tentatively named the "Scientific Investigation Agency" (SIA), formed to deal with kaiju and supernatural phenomena as the focus of the new show. The pair also agreed to add unused conceptions from Ultra Q and WoO. Tsuburaya had spent significant amounts of studio money to build his models for the Godzilla films. The studio was desirous to monetize these miniatures and was looking for a task that could repurpose the sets and suits from the Godzilla franchise. The first version of Ultraman was named "Bemler". The name "Bemler" (sometimes trademarked as "Bemular") was later given to Ultraman's first foe in the show's first episode, titled "Ultra Operation No. 1".

In January 1966, the project's title became Redman because of the protagonist's color scheme. The following month, the series was unanimously approved for production. In this version, Redman arrives as a refugee on Earth after invaders destroyed his home planet. Redman fuses with officer Sakomizu and together, they protect the Earth from kaiju and alien invaders. During casting TBS suggested casting actors that looked as Western as possible, to appeal to overseas markets. It was later arranged to add a female character to the SIA roster. Many of the cast members came from Toho, including Akiji Kobayashi as the team leader, Susumu Kurobe as Ultraman's human host, and Bin Furuya as Ultraman. The copyright offices authorized the registration of the show, now titled Ultraman, on March 22, 1966.

Tsuburaya found the original versions of Ultraman's design to be "too alien and sinister" and requested that production designer Tohl Narita continue drafting additional designs as teleplays were being written concurrently. Narita chose to root Ultraman's design in the Greek concept of cosmos (order and harmony), in contrast to Narita's monster designs for Ultra Q which were rooted in the Greek concept of khaos. Narita also took inspiration from the art of Miyamoto Musashi in designing the character and Tsuburaya and Kinjo also provided input to Narita's designs. Ultraman's silver skin symbolized steel from an interstellar rocket and the red lining represented the surface of Mars. Ragone stated that Ultraman became Tsuburaya's "most popular and enduring creation".

Filming on Ultraman began in March, and the crew was divided into three separate groups for its live-action and special effects. Tsuburaya Productions and TBS initially arranged to begin broadcasting the series on July 17 but the latter company chose to release it the week before. After a few meetings between the two companies and sponsors, it was decided that a pilot episode originally planned as the "Ultraman Eve Festival", to introduce the show's title character. The pilot episode was aired on July 10—one of the dates that have been cited as Tsuburaya's birthday—that year under the title The Birth of Ultraman: An Ultraman Premiere Celebration. Ultraman became a larger hit than its predecessor, obtaining a 40% viewership. With monsters now available to watch at home weekly, children fewer asked their parents to take them to the theater. Consequently, Tsuburaya Productions' triumph in television was diverting box-office money from Toho's kaiju films.The War of the Gargantuas, the third Honda-Tsuburaya kaiju film produced in collaboration with Henry G. Saperstein, centers on scientists investigating the appearance of two giant hairy humanoids who eventually combat in Tokyo. Initially drafted as a sequel to Frankenstein vs. Baragon, the film went through several titles during scripting and the final film was referred to by film chronicler Stuart Galbraith IV as a "quasi–sequel" to its predecessor. The film premiered in Japan in July 1966.

After Tsuburaya's series Booska the Friendly Beast began airing on television in November, he received his last credit as "special effects director" on a Godzilla film, for Ebirah, Horror of the Deep. However, his disciple Sadamasa Arikawa was actually promoted to act as a de facto special effects director for this film and Tsuburaya's credit was merely ceremonial. The following year Tsuburaya directed the effects for King Kong Escapes, a Japanese-American co-production created to celebrate Toho's thirty-fifth anniversary. In homage to the dinosaur fighting scene from King Kong (1933), he introduced Gorosaurus, a dinosaurian kaiju that battles Kong on Mondo Island in the film. The ensuing 1967 release featuring Tsuburaya's contributions was Ultraseven, the Thunderbirds-influenced third entry in the Ultra series. The series received a 33.7% rating upon beginning airing on October 7, 1967. Also in 1967, he was appointed "special effects supervisor" and handed over the position of special effects director for the Godzilla film series to Arikawa for Son of Godzilla.

Final works and last years (1968–1970)
In 1967, Tsuburaya Productions' writing crew took elements from Shinichi Sekizawa's screenplay, The Flying Battleship, and inserted concepts from it into a series similar to James Bond and Voyage to the Bottom of the Sea. Concerning a team of secret agents established by a prosperous industrialist to oppose the acts of the military organization referred to as "Q", Mighty Jack, was aimed at a mature audience in contrary to Tsuburaya's Ultra series and Booska the Friendly Beast. Due to pressure from Fuji TV, the series declined rapidly after the release of its first episode on April 6, 1968. Many teleplays were filmed without revision, effects work frequently lacked time, and reshoots were often unattainable. Fuji TV assumed the series a failure due to its 8.3% audience rating, and they canceled the series after Tsuburaya Productions finished producing 13 of the scheduled 26 episodes. A sequel to the series, titled Fight! Mighty Jack, later began broadcasting in July 1968.

With budgets rising, less returning crew, and theatergoers being dragged away by television, producer Tomoyuki Tanaka chose to conclude the Godzilla series but offered one last film for the original staff. Honda's consequential kaiju epic, Destroy All Monsters (1968), featured effects directed by Sadamasa Arikawa that Tsuburaya allegedly supervised. His next release of that year was another Seiji Maruyama's war epic, Admiral Yamamoto, a sequel to Japan's Longest Day (1967) that starred Mifune as Imperial Japanese Navy Marshal Admiral Isoroku Yamamoto, who was also the topic of Honda and Tsuburaya's Eagle of the Pacific. On September 15, 1968, the week after the final episode of Ultraseven was broadcast and just over a month after Admiral Yamamoto was distributed to Japanese theaters by Toho, his following credit, Tsuburaya Productions' Operation: Mystery, began airing on the Japanese television channel TBS, where he served as the show's supervisor.Latitude Zero, released by Toho in July 1969, was a Japanese-American collaboration produced by Toho and Don Sharp Productions. In comparison, retrospective writers have praised Tsuburaya's model work, especially his submarines, which Ryfle and Godziszewski noted resembled Thunderbirds machines in Gerry Anderson's show of the same name. Like Honda and Tsuburaya's previous effort, Latitude Zero only grossed , making it a box office failure.

Tsuburaya quickly moved on to his next project, Battle of the Japan Sea, regarded as the third film in the "Toho 8.15 series" (following Admiral Yamamoto and Japan's Longest Day). Tsuburaya was provided with his largest budget ever for this Maruyama-directed war epic about what is considered the greatest military victory in Japanese history, the Russo-Japanese War. Thus, 60 members of his department's artists created an estimated 107 ship miniatures for the film and constructed a 13-meter model replica of the Imperial Japanese Navy's battleship Mikasa in contrast to the other 3-meter ships. Released in August, Battle of the Japan Sea was the second highest Japanese grosser of 1969, earning  against its  budget. Deemed one of Tsuburaya's masterpieces, it was the last production that he officially participated as the special effects director. The same month as Battle of the Japan Sea was released, Tsuburaya Productions' next series, Horror Theater Unbalance (aired in 1973), began production for which Tsuburaya was credited as its supervisor.

Tsuburaya and several of Toho's effects crew members spent the majority of 1969 working together to create, Birth of the Japanese Islands, an audiovisual exhibit for the Expo '70 that simulated earthquakes and volcanoes. His commitment to this project prevented him from being involved in the production of All Monsters Attack (1969), and director Honda handled the effects instead of him for the first time. Nonetheless, the director stated that Tsuburaya was "personally involved with the editing," adding: "The film may have been generally put together [by others], but he definitely looked it over and instructed the staff to shorten certain scenes, and so on."

Having ignored his doctor's recent advice to reduce his workload due to declining health, Tsuburaya's health continued to deteriorate and, during filming for the Expo '70 film presentation, Tsuburaya collapsed while visiting the Naruto whirlpools and was subsequently hospitalized. Refusing to remain in the hospital, Tsuburaya was instructed to recover at home and cancel any assignments. Thus, Hajime took over his father's position as president at Tsuburaya Productions on November 30. In December, Tsuburaya completed filming the Expo '70 project for Mitsubishi and moved to his Ukiyama Villa on the Izu Peninsula in Itō, Shizuoka with his wife. At the villa, he persisted in writing his autobiography and dedicated himself to the film outlines Japan Airplane Guy and Princess Kaguya. While he continued to write the Japan Airplane Guy story treatment daily, he expressed his desire to work on more projects in the future and return to Tokyo on January 26, 1970. However, on January 25, 1970, at 10:15 P.M., Masano awoke and discovered that Tsuburaya had died while sleeping with her at the villa in Itō, Shizuoka. Japanese sources have cited the cause of his death as angina associated with a asthma attack.

On January 27, a mourning tradition took place at the Tsuburaya family's house. His funeral was held at the Seijō Catholic Church on January 29, with his eldest son Hajime serving as the chief mourner. The following day, he was posthumously awarded the Honorary Chairman Award by the Japanese Society of Cinematographers and the Order of the Sacred Treasure by Emperor Hirohito. A Catholic service was held at Toho Studios on February 2, with The Last War producer Sanezumi Fujimoto providing the services. Five hundred friends and colleagues attended the service, including actor Kazuo Hasegawa, The War at Sea from Hawaii to Malaya director Kajirō Yamamoto, The Three Treasures director Hiroshi Inagaki, and A Thousand and One Nights with Toho director Kon Ichikawa. He was later entombed at the Catholic Cemetery in Fuchū, Tokyo, Japan.
Filmmaking
Style, themes, and techniques

Tsuburaya's career in film production evolved from small-scale jidaigeki films to financially successful war and science fiction epics. During his stint as a cinematographer in the early 20th century, Tsuburaya closely researched international cinema in order to incorporate some of the techniques and improve his innovative style; some of these films include: The Lost World (1925), Metropolis (1927), and King Kong (1933). Tsuburaya remarked that King Kong heavily influenced him to work in special effects. He decided to accomplish special effects sequences in films showcasing his contributions by utilizing miniature effects and synthesis technology involving layered strips of film. Tsuburaya constantly converted new special effects techniques and tested them on a daily basis and became the founder and head of Japanese special effects (known as Tokusatsu), earning him the title "Father of Tokusatsu". Biographer August Ragone writes that his footage, which was always filmed live on a soundstage in comparison to modern techniques such as computer-generated imagery, could be "silly or deadly, beautiful or terrifying, but no matter how fanciful or fantastic, his visual effects seem to live and breathe with a life of their own."

For Godzilla (1954), Tsuburaya created the suit acting technique known as "suitmation" because the film's small budget and tight schedule restrained him to portray Godzilla via stop motion (à la King Kong). Film historian Steve Ryfle writes that, although suitmation was not as elaborate as the stop motion techniques by effects pioneers Willis H. O'Brien (creator of the effects in King Kong) and Ray Harryhausen (creator of the effects in The Beast from 20,000 Fathoms), it gave the special effects director a more effective approach to depict the destruction sequences that made Godzilla famous.

Tsuburaya employed multiple recurring themes in his films, including nuclear holocaust, world wars, monster invasions, and intergalactic conflicts.

Relationship with cast and crew

According to Ishirō Honda biographers Steve Ryfle and Ed Godziszewski, it was difficult to collaborate with Tsuburaya. Although the director was in charge of any production, he refused to surrender control of his sector. He opposed when his scenes were re-edited and refused to allow mainstream directors to stare into the viewfinder in case they assess the camera angle, set, etc. As remarked by Godzilla suit actor Haruo Nakajima, although Tsuburaya was usually smiling and had a refreshing disposition onset, he was often angry with the staff. Special effects cinematographer Tomioka Mototaka claimed he was in a position to be scolded by Tsuburaya against cinematographer Sadamasa Arikawa; photography assistants Takao Tsurumi and Mitsuru Chokai testified that Tsuburaya did not get angry directly when young individuals in his unit failed but scolded Arikawa and others.

On the contrary, Tsuburaya —who the cast and crew often referred to as the "Old Man"—  was rarely infuriated by actors. In an interview regarding August Ragone's biography on Tsuburaya, Nakajima said he was a "very reserved man on the set. Most of the direction he gave me for the performances was, 'I trust you to do it. Do what you feel is best, I'll leave it up to you.' And that's the way he was for most of the films we worked on together after Godzilla." He added: "After the wires broke on the Rodan suit, causing me to fall several meters onto the miniature set, he chided, 'It's good that you didn't die; because I need you to finish the film.'" Ultraman suit actor Bin Furuya remarked in an interview regarding Nezura 1964 (2020), that the special effects director was "usually a normal kind person" and always encouraged his actors to act as if they were in the kind of film that would "give dreams to children".

Filming and editing
Tsuburaya had several methods to shoot his films. During his stint as a cinematographer, he was the first to use crane shoting and key light prior to World War II. According to camera operator Mitsuo Miura, Tsuburaya also filmed "pseudo nightscapes" using beer bottle fragments as a filter, and his disciple Sadamasa Arikawa became the first photographer in Japan to shoot with color filters. During his late life, Tsuburaya explained to cinematographer Tomioka that he had always recognized how many frames could be taken with a hand-cranked camera, and he was able to turn it instinctively.

Honda said that Tsuburaya's approach to film special effects was "like a physics experiment, no different than trying to make new discoveries." Tsuburaya's lighting engineer Kaoru Saitō remarked that his camera work in special effects only moved sideways or moves up and down with a crane once the main position is decided, and the camera itself does not approach forward. Saitō also testified that he demanded the subject approach the camera and never shot the set from the other side of the camera.

According to Arikawa, Tsuburaya also edited his own film work. Tsuburaya's assistant director, Masakatsu Asai, stated that memorized the situation and storage location of the cuts he shot. Scripter Keiko Suzuki said Tsuburaya envisioned his own editing plan, and he often filmed scenes unscripted. Thus, for instance, scenes were altered to become "Battle 1" and "Aerial Battle 2".

Legacy
Cultural impact

In spite of his death, Tsuburaya's name and work remained prominent because his tokusatsu films and television shows generated a global fandom. A year after his death, Tsuburaya's intent to revitalize Ultraman was eventuated into Return of Ultraman (1971-1972), which launched a new string of the "Ultra" series throughout the rest of the decade. Despite having difficulty after their father's passing, Hajime, Noboru, and Akira kept running Tsuburaya Productions and never gave up his legacy, even when Tsuburaya Productions only had just three employees before the home video revived the Ultraman series. In 1989, Noboru declared that Ultraman is his father's "most important legacy" even if Godzilla is Tsuburaya's most popular character overseas.

Tsuburaya Productions described Tsuburaya as the "Father of Tokusatsu" because of his "astounding balancing act of technique and entertainment". The Independent's Doug Bolton wrote that even "people not familiar with Japanese science fiction will easily recognise  the legacy of Tsuburaya's work". The Tokusatsu Network said that Tsuburaya was "possibly the most influential figure in the Japanese film industry" and stated that his legacy "lives on to this day through his creations and has had a large enough impact for him to be compared to Walt Disney."

Tsuburaya's work has been cited as an inspiration to numerous people in the entertainment industry around the world, including George Lucas, Steven Spielberg,  Martin Scorsese,  Brad Pitt, Quentin Tarantino, Tim Burton, John Carpenter, Chris Kirkpatrick, Will Smith, Guillermo del Toro, Shinji Higuchi, and Attack on Titan creator Hajime Isayama. During the early 1970s, Lucas visited Toho when looking for a company to produce the special effects for Star Wars (1977) since Tsuburaya had established the company as a mecca for producing special effects. Spielberg stated that Tsuburaya's Godzilla was the "most masterful of all the dinosaur movies, because it made you believe that it was really happening."

Posthumous works
Tsuburaya had intended to work on Space Amoeba (1970), but he died shortly after filming began. While the film was completed in Tsuburaya's honor and was his last project to be involved in, Toho executives refused to grant him a dedication in its opening credits.

A script for a project entitled Princess Kaguya was written by Tsuburaya shortly before he died in Izu. Motivated by his father's desire to work on another adaptation of the tale, Hajime Tsubruaya attempted to produce Princess Kaguya into a film for Tsuburaya Productions' 10th anniversary. In the preface of Hiroyasu Yamaura's script for the film, Tsuburaya said he had taken "great pains to incorporate the strengths of various folk tales and fairy tales into a work that children around the world would honestly enjoy". Despite his tireless efforts, he passed away on the morning of February 9, 1973, before director Yoshiyuki Kuroda was scheduled to begin production that evening. Thus, production on the project was canceled. In 1987, producer Tomoyuki Tanaka turned Eiji Tsuburaya's lifelong ambition into a live-action movie titled Princess from the Moon, which featured effects directed by Tsuburaya's protégé Teruyoshi Nakano.

In 2020, filmmaker Minoru Kawasaki created a film loosely based on his unmade film prior to production of Godzilla, featuring a giant octopus.

Portrayals
Many actors have played Tsuburaya in television dramas and programs. For his portrayal in the 1989 television drama The Men Who Made Ultraman, an unidentified renowned Toho actor who had been starring in many of the company's box office hits since before Godzilla (1954) was initially cast as Tsuburaya. However, the famed actor declined the offer, believing he lacked similarities in appearance to Tsuburaya. Therefore, actor Kō Nishimura was cast instead. In 1993, filmmaker Seijun Suzuki played Tsuburaya in the television drama I Loved Ultraseven. For The Pair of Ultraman, a 2022 television documentary on the two screenwriters behind Ultraman, he was portrayed by Toshiki Ayada.

Tributes

In 2001, two toy companies distributed figures of Tsuburaya in honor of the 100th anniversary of his birth. In celebration of the 114th anniversary of his birth, Google artist Jennifer Hom and her colleges made an animated doodle of his work in special effects on July 7, 2015. The doodle allowed users to have a create Tsuburaya's key monster movies and television shows.

On January 11, 2019, after construction over a period of five years, the Eiji Tsuburaya Museum opened in his hometown of Sukagawa, a tribute to his life and work in film and television. During the museum's opening ceremony, Mayor Katsuya Hashimoto stated that the museum is "an archival center that will disseminate Japanese special effects to the world." In commemoration of 120 years since his birth, the National Film Archive of Japan held a celebratory event in Sukagawa in cooperation with Tsuburaya Productions from August to November 2021. In September 2021, the first screening of Princess Kaguya'' since its original 1935 release was held at the event (However, it was in shortened form since the original print is still believed to be lost).

Selected filmography

Because he worked on roughly 250 films over his five-decade career, the following is only a selection of significant productions, and a more comprehensive list, including most of the media that featured his contributions, is covered in a separate article.

Films

Television

Awards and honors

Notes

References

Citations

Bibliography

Further reading

External links

 

Eiji Tsuburaya at Sukagawa City 
Eiji Tsuburaya at Toho 
Eiji Tsuburaya at Tsuburaya Productions
Eiji Tsuburaya at Tsuburaya Station 
Eiji Tsuburaya Museum 

1901 births
1970 deaths
20th-century apocalypticists
Converts to Roman Catholicism
Converts to Roman Catholicism from Buddhism
Godzilla (franchise)
Japanese Roman Catholics
Japanese science fiction writers
Japanese television producers
People from Sukagawa
Special effects people
Tsuburaya Productions
Ultra Series
Japanese film editors
Japanese inventors
20th-century Japanese inventors
Aviation photographers
Japanese aviators
Japanese cinematographers
Science fiction film directors
Fantasy film directors
Propaganda film directors
Imperial Japanese Army soldiers
Recipients of the Order of the Sacred Treasure, 4th class
Recipients of the Order of the Sacred Treasure
Japanese company founders
Deaths from asthma
Japanese animators
Japanese documentary film directors
People expelled from public office
20th-century Japanese businesspeople
Japanese screenwriters
Japanese male screenwriters
20th-century Japanese writers
20th-century male writers
Japanese film producers
Deaths from angina pectoris